Anthony Savino "Sonny" Marinelli (born May 2, 1967) is an American actor and voice actor. Marinelli is best known for his acting roles in Vegas, Entourage and Noel. Marinelli also played the role of mobster John Gotti in the 2001 television movie Boss of Bosses.

Career
Marinelli attended the American Academy of Dramatic Arts in New York City to study acting. He first started acting in 1991 and his first film role was in Jumpin' at the Boneyard. He later went on to act in several television series with recurring roles in both Falcone and That's Life. In 2001, he played the role of mobster John Gotti in the television movie Boss of Bosses. He also voiced Henry Tomasino in the 2010 video game Mafia II and went on to provide additional voices in the 2016 video game Mafia III. Marinelli is also a founding member of the Actors Gym Theater Company along with Robert Moresco.

Filmography

Film

Television

Video games

References

External links

1967 births
American male film actors
American male television actors
American male video game actors
American male voice actors
American people of Italian descent
Living people
Male actors from New York City